The African-American Shakespeare Company (AASC) is a 501(c)3 nonprofit professional regional theatre company in San Francisco, California. Since its founding in 1994 Sherri Young has been its Executive Director and in 2009 L. Peter Callender joined as its Artistic Director.

AASC is a member of the Shakespeare Theatre Association.

History 
Sherri Young, a graduate of the American Conservatory Theater's Master of Fine Arts Program in 1992, believed there was a problem with theatre companies and color-blind casting as well as the "expectation that they [actors of color] would stick to 'black plays' when they graduated". Young thought this was "inconceivable and unacceptable" which motivated her to create the African-American Shakespeare Company to provide opportunities for actors of color in mastering classical theatre.

Sherri Young is on the board of Handful Players, a children's musical theatre, and was previously Commissioner for the San Francisco Arts Commission where she was appointed by Gavin Newsom.

L. Peter Callender joined the company as its Artistic Director in 2009. Callender was trained at The Juilliard School in New York, Webber Douglas Academy of Dramatic Art in England, and Tadashi Suzuki Company of Toga in Japan. He has been an Associate Artist at California Shakespeare Theater for over 20 years and has appeared in productions by Marin Theatre Company, Berkeley Repertory Theatre, and Aurora Theatre Company. Callender is also a Visiting Instructor at Stanford University and has been nominated for and won numerous awards: Helen Hayes Award Nominations: Best Actor — Playboy of the West Indies, and Oak and Ivy; New York Audelco Award —Black Eagles; Audience Award: Best Actor — Master Harold…and the Boys, Bay Area Critics Award: Best Actor – (World Music), East Bay Express: Best Actor of the East Bay, Several Dean Goodman Awards: Outstanding Lead Actor: Twelfth Night, Cymbeline, Saint Joan, and others.

Location 
AASC is a resident organization at the city-owned African American Art and Culture Complex (AAACC) with its office located at 762 Fulton Street Suite 306 in San Francisco, California, 94102. Since 2002, it has staged its productions at the 200-seat Buriel Clay Theater located on the ground floor of the AAACC building with an annual audience of over 7,500 patrons. However, for its 2016–17 season, it has moved its productions from the Buriel Clay Theater to the San Francisco War Memorial and Performing Arts Center's Herbst Theatre for Cinderella, Marines' Memorial Theatre for August Wilson's Jitney, and San Francisco Opera's Taube Atrium Theatre for William Shakespeare's The Winter's Tale. Callender states the reason for the move was due to "the business operations model of the Complex has changed under the new leadership, which has made it increasingly difficult to produce our works. The leadership has reduced our rehearsal time, tech time, and preview times."

Productions 
Its signature production of the classic Cinderella fairytale is an annual holiday tradition. In addition to Cinderella, AASC typically produces two Shakespearean plays and one play by a contemporary playwright each season. Seasons begin in September/October and lasts through May/June. The 2016–17 season will be its 22nd year.

Past productions includes William Shakespeare's Othello, Antony and Cleopatra, The Comedy of Errors, Julius Caesar, The Merry Wives of Windsor, Romeo and Juliet, The Taming of the Shrew, The Tempest, and Twelfth Night; Tennessee Williams' Cat on a Hot Tin Roof; and George C. Wolfe's The Colored Museum.

Shake-It-Up Arts Education Program 
AASC offers an arts education program called Shake-It-Up. The goal of the program is to provide students with skills of tackling complex reading and strengthening comprehension skills through theatre techniques and games in a positive and creative environment. These are done through workshops which educators sign-up for and professional educators/artists lead the sessions. In addition, AASC offers free student matinees for public schools where more than 2,200 students and their chaperones from all over the San Francisco Bay Area attend each season. AASC also offers educators a Teacher's Night Out event for preview performances where educators can attend at no cost.

The Cultural Corridor 
Since 2015, AASC has hosted an annual free community outdoor performance series in the Fillmore District, Western Addition, and Hayes Valley neighborhoods of San Francisco known as The Cultural Corridor. The goal of the series is to unite performing arts groups in the neighborhood and highlight the cultural diversity of the area. The series began in September/October 2015 with three one-hour performances at the Fillmore Mini Park (Fillmore St between Turk St and Golden Gate Ave) leading up to the main three-hour performance at the PROXY open space (Hayes St and Octavia Blvd). In 2016, it added another location to the performance series at Buchanan Street Mall (Buchanan St and McAllister St) and three additional one-hour performances. Participants included AfroSolo, The San Francisco Bay Area Theatre Company, Nitty Dupree Studio of Dance, Cultural Odyssey: The Medea Project, SambaFunk!, SFJAZZ , San Francisco Ballet, San Francisco Conservatory of Music, Alumni and Friends of the San Francisco Youth Symphony, and Citizen Film.

Partnerships 
AASC partners with various organizations in the San Francisco Bay Area throughout the years. Macy's was a sponsor of its Cinderella student matinees and offered special invitation to AASC supporters to various events such as Black History Month celebration events at their Union Square store. AASC partnered with the Golden Thread Productions to produce Isfahan Blues, a story inspired by Duke Ellington's tour of Iran in 1963. In 2015 for its production of Romeo & Juliet, it partnered with Oakland School for the Arts to cast teen actors in title and supporting roles as well as Litquake for their Teenquake programming. AASC has also collaborated with the San Francisco Opera for their Cinderella exploration workshop for families.

Awards 
 2013 San Francisco Bay Area Theatre Critics Circle Paine Knickerbocker Award
 2014 Theatre Bay Area Outstanding Performance by a Female Actor in a Principal Role in a Play – Leontyne Mbele-Mbong, Medea

See also 
 American Conservatory Theater, San Francisco, California
 San Francisco Playhouse, San Francisco, California
 California Shakespeare Theater, Orinda, California
 Marin Theatre Company, Mill Valley, California
 Marin Shakespeare Company
 Aurora Theatre Company, Berkeley, California
 Berkeley Repertory Theatre, Berkeley, California

References

External links 
 Official website — African-AmericanShakes.org

Theatre companies in California
Shakespearean theatre companies
Culture in the San Francisco Bay Area
Theatre companies in San Francisco
Regional theatre in the United States
Theatre in the San Francisco Bay Area